The Desert Rat Scrap Book (or DRSB) was a (roughly) quarterly, southwestern humor publication based in Thousand Palms, California. DRSB was published in editions of 10,000 to 20,000 copies, whenever its creator, Harry Oliver had sufficient material, and money enough to pay the printer. Forty-six issues were printed and distributed via Southern California bookstores and newsstands, and by mail worldwide. DRSB was devoted to lore, legends, lies and laughs of the American Southwest region, especially featuring prospectors and other desert rats. The publication was launched in late 1945 and ran through early 1967.

Structure

Format
The DRSB was published in a unique format, printed on both sides of heavy creme-colored stock of about 17 x 22 inches (43.3 x 55.5 centimetres) (Demy) paper size, folded double three times to yield "the smallest newspaper in the world and the only 5-page one... only newspaper in America you can open in the wind." Pages 1 and 5 (the front and back) are about 5.5 x 8.5 inches; page 2 is about 8.5 x 11 inches; page 3 is about 11 x 17 inches; page 5 is the full 17 x 22 inches. See these images, from the March 1953 issue of Arizona Highways magazine, for an illustration of the expansion.

Numbers
Each issue was a 'packet'; each volume was a 'pouch'. The first issue, dated FALL 1946 (but possibly printed on Oliver's birthday of 4 April 1946) was not numbered. The second issue, dated WINTER 1946–47, was numbered PACKET TWO OF POUCH ONE. All further editions were undated, and numbered as PACKET XXX OF POUCH YYY. Sometimes more than three months passed between editions, which is why PACKET TWO OF POUCH TWELVE (the final issue) appeared in 1967, over 20 years from the first.

Layout
PAGE ONE, rarely overprinted with one garish color, usually featured an Oliver woodcut or a cartoon (sometimes by Walt Disney or Hank Ketcham), and would often announce a theme for that issue – see Themes below. The issue contents might (or might not) generally follow that theme. In just a very few issues, a full-cover illustration would spread over both the first and last pages.

PAGE TWO would usually (but not always) contain the masthead and boilerplate, something like the following:
This paper is not entered as 2nd class mail.It's a first class newspaper.
Packet xxx of Pouch yyy
Smallest newspaper in the worldand the only 5 paged one.
Published at Fort Oliver
1000 Palms, California
Four Times a Year
ON THE NEWS STANDS 10¢ A COPY
But sometimes they don't have them.
ONE YEAR BY MAIL – 4 COPIES 50¢
Darned if I am going to the trouble of mailing it for nothing.
10 Years ..................... $5.00
100 Years .....................$50.00
This offer expires when I do.
Asbestos editions will be forwarded in case you don't make it.
Published by
HARRY OLIVER
1888–1999
Fort Commander, Publisher, Distributor, Lamp Lighter, Editor, Artist, Gardener, Janitor, Owner
Following would be an 'editorial', various 'news' items and gags and aphorisms or factoids (original or clipped from other sources) under old-time fonts headings, interspersed with small block prints and/or cartoons of desert characters.

PAGE THREE usually contained more of the same, with some slightly longer text pieces, by Oliver or other writers. Many of these items were recycled from previous Oliver publications – Oliver was his own best plagiarist.

PAGE FOUR had yet more of the same, often with even longer pieces (including a complete play once) that might address the issue's theme. Along the bottom of this largest page might be a few advertisements, for ghost towns and publications and date farms and rock shops.

PAGE FIVE, above the mailing address block, might contain a list of conversation starters, or more gags and news and quotes, or a promotion for Oliver's audio album of readings, or maybe just a large woodcut and an essay or mini-epic poem.

Just one issue, Packet Four of Pouch Four, named DESERT RAT HARRY OLIVER'S JOKE BOOK, did not follow the above formats. This is a 32-page book (plus covers), sized about 5.5 x 8.5 inches, folded and stapled. The contents are primarily the usual short gags. The heading on page one says FIRST DESERT JOKE BOOK. This was apparently an unsuccessful experiment.

Impact

Themes
Each issue bore on the front cover the name of a supposed theme for that issue, such as: Desert Burros, Death Valley, Good Old Desert Fun, Ghost Towns, Along the Border, Simplicity, Indians, Desert Folklore, Peg-Leg Smith's Gold, Lost Mines And Buried Treasure, Frontier Wild Women, Desert Rats & Hermits, Death Valley Scotty, etc. Besides these, Oliver would also deal with such themes as: The Lost Ship of the Desert; his Desert County secession movement and Keep the Desert Beautiful campaign; outlaws and lawmen; communicating with animals; and what others had written about him.

Ambiance
The above descriptions do nothing to convey the ambiance and attraction of the Desert Rat Scrap Book. It's like holding a booklet that becomes an old-time news sheet, filled with information old and new, real and imaginary, serious and hilarious, all informed by a strong and cantankerous personality. There's always another detail in another corner, another timeless tidbit waiting for a patient reader to stumble upon. Even when new, each issue is a small time machine.

Influence
Just as Oliver's design of Gold Gulch, at the San Diego World's Fair (California Pacific International Exposition) of 1935–36, strongly influenced the development of Western theme parks and frontier village reconstructions, so his DRSB can be seen to help shape subsequent Western Americana literary ephemera. The DRSB can also be seen as an ancestor of zine culture

Issues

Dating
Dating any specific issue has always been problematic. Postmarks on mailed issues are not always helpful. Harry Oliver produced all issues ('packets') of the first 11 pouches, often at very irregular intervals. Later issues depended heavily on reprinted items. Due to failing health and attitude, Oliver ceased publication in 1965. In 1967 he gave his operation to ex-merchant seaman Bill Powers, who produced two more issues (Packets One and Two of Pouch Twelve) and reprinted a few old issues, then abandoned the DRSB forever and disappeared, possibly returning to sea.

First packet was printed on 4 April 1946.
Packet 4, Pouch 5, printed on 4 April 1953.

Contents
NOTE:   Following is a necessarily incomplete summary of DRSB 'articles'. This list may merely give a taste of the fractally-complex contents of each issue. Unless credited otherwise, text and art are presumably by Oliver.

 Pouch One
 "Packet One" (unnumbered), Camp Edition, Saddle Bag Size, Fall Edition 1946 – Will Rogers Says; Harry Oliver's Argument Starters; Toad Watson's Christmas; Rip Snortin'; Pack Rats and Dope; Fame For Nothin'; Adobe
  Packet Two, Winter Edition 1946–47 – How to be a Desert Rat and Like It, by John Hilton; The Desert, by Don Blanding; Death Valley Scotty, Desert Rat, Showman; Wiffletree Carries the Mail; How to Build With Adobe; Indian Signs
  Packet Three – What the Desert Rats are Doing Today; Petrified Pete; The Borego Calicoes; Yuma is an Interesting Town; Adobe; The Peak of Saint Hyacinth; Dog Eater, by Charles M. Russell; Desert Rat Ten Commandments
  Packet Four, The Windy Number – Water Witches; Jose y el Burro; Chaparral; Captain Catnip Ashby; All's Not Gold That Glitters; That's 30, by Lloyd Smith, Director of the Palm Springs Desert Museum; Haywire Weather; Wind, Wind, and More Wind
 Pouch Two
 Packet One, The Burro Number (cover woodblock by Lon Megargee) – Jose and the Burro; Whiskers and Christmas; Burros, An Interview; The Barber of Calexico; Adobe, by John Hilton; Gold, $70.00 an Ounce; Squaw Wood
 Packet Two (to be determined)
 Packet Three, Along The Border Packet – No Burro, No Gold; Screwbean Benny; So You Are a Hermit; Hell in Texas (song), by George E. Hastings; Two Stories of Old Fort Oliver; The "Screaming Sands" of "Smuggler's Charybdis"; The Transplanted Ghosts at Knott's
 Packet Four, 2nd Anniversary Packet – How Editors Get Rich; The Sad Tail of Arty Packrat; Low Down on Big Horn, by George Pipkin of Death Valley; Tarantula Hawks an' Aeroplanes; Brigham Young and His 20 Wives in Grand Melee; The Lord's Mine, by John C. Herr; Water Water; Chicken Gold; How to be a Desert Rat and Like It, by John Hilton
 Pouch Three
 Packet One, Hot Weather Packet (cover cartoon by Bob Dell) – Lost Mines; Gold Is Where You Find It; Boot Hill's of the Old West, by Herbert W. Kuhm; Our Good Neighbor, Texas, by S. Omar Barker; Your Editor's Prayer; The Chaparral Cock (poem), by Walt Beckwith; Mischievous Burros, by Erle Stanley Gardner; There's Gold in Them Thar Hills, by John C. Hebb; Squaw Wood
 Packet Two, Death Valley Packet – Shorty Harris; Pay Dirt; Egg Packer of the Panamints, by George Palmer Putnam; Death Valley Scotty's Record-Breaking Dash on the Coyote Special, by Lee Shippey; Old Prumes, Colorado's Best-Loved Burro, by Mrs. James Rose Harvey; Death Valley and its Country, by George Palmer Putnam; Panamint Pete, by Leonard F. Murnane; Tall But Short Stories from Death Valley
 Packet Three, Moonlight on the Colorado Packet – How the Spaniards Came to Think California Was an Island; The Spanish Galleon at the Bottom of the Salton Sea; Burros, What They Are Made Of, by Mrs. James Rose Harvey; Earthquakes & Horse Pants; Alligators in the Rio Colorado, by John Hilton; The Pack Rat's Nest; Irvin S. Cobb's Description of Grand Canyon; The River in Red, by Edwin Corle; Ribbons of Wood; A Ship in the Algodones, by David O. Woodbury; Yuma in 1776, by Father Fout
 Packet Four, Treasure Packet – Dick Wick Hall's Mine Was Lost as Stockholders Look On; Wimmin and Cows, by Ken McClure; The Spanish Galleon of Salton Sea, by Antonio de Fierro; West Still Wild, by Harry Carr; Where Is Pegleg Smith's Lost Mine; Sidewalks of Silver, by John Hilton; Old Time Remedies; The James Boys Loot, by J. Frank Dobie; Gold, You Can Have It If You Get The Right Shovel
 Pouch Four
 Packet One, Good Old Desert Fun – Nevada, Bad Men Buried Alone; A True Desert Turtle Story, by John C. Herr; Fairplay Burro Race Denied Betting Permit; The Burro Led Men to Gold and Silver, by Lucile and Harold Weight; Lem's Fame For Nothin'; Rip's Jumpin' Cactus Drink; Desert Rat Circus, by Geo. A Stingle; Quicksilver Humor
 Packet Two, Desert Magic Packet (cover cartoon by Bob Dell) – Singing Sands of Fort Oliver; Hermit Business; Telling About When a Man's Wealth Was Measured by the Size of His Bedroll; Pageant of Death Valley; The Magic of Desert Air, by George A. Stingle; Mirage; Desert Weather, Unusual as Usual; Whisky Joe, A Story With a Moral; More About Pegleg Smith, by W.T. Russell
 Packet Three, Minnehaha's Tee-Hee Packet, Injun Stuff, Indian Packet (cover cartoon by Wilbur Timpe) – Indian Cradleboard, by Mrs. Ben Hicks; Death Valley and Peg Leg Too, by William Caruthers; Back to the Reservation; Indian Signs You Should Know; Gold in the Heart of Santa Rosa Mountain; Wampum
 Packet Four, Desert Rat Harry Oliver's Joke Book (cover art by Art Loomer overprinted in red) – First Desert Joke Book; Hot Weather; Burros; Wind, Wind, and More Wind; My Dog Whiskers; Injun Stuff; Death Valley
 Pouch Five
 Packet One, Good Old Desert Fun, Kindness to Animals Packet (cover cartoon by Frank Adams) – I Am a Little Ashamed; Sinful Gold; Smart Roadrunner; The Pack Rat's Nest, by Allen J. Papen; U.S. Army Mule; Old Abe Died in 1881, by Chas. Lockwood; Being a Hero is a Lifetime Job; Walter (P.T. Barnum) Knott; Burros; Yuma's (Red Cross) Mosquitos
 Packet Two, Frontier Wild Women Good & Bad, Wild Women Packet – Grass Valley's Lotta Crabtree; Lola Montez of the Roaring Fifties; Westward the Women, by Nancy Wilson Ross; Street of Red Lights in old Virginia City; Shorty Harris and the Primadonna; The Frozen Flame of Mt. San Jacinto; The Wages of Sin, by John Herr; This Is California, The Last Slice of La Ballona Rancho; My Old Dog, by Pancho
 Packet Three, Death Valley & Nevada Packet – Nuts to Daylight Savings; A New Show is Born; Shoshone Minnie's First Aid Kit; The West's Most Western Town, by Stevens Gaugh; No More Frontier, by Bill Nye 1886; Critics Don't Agree on What is Wrong With my Book; The Withering Winds of the Mojave Desert; Be a One Page Desert Naturalist
 Packet Four, Cool Desert Summer Packet (cover cartoon by Maggie Gerke overprinted in red) – My Dog Whiskers, Worse Than Death; Faith, by John Herr; Campaign For Burro Protection Mounting Throughout Desert Area, by L. Burr Belden; She Pinched Out, by Old Bill Williams; A Cousin Jack Paul Bunyan, by Chas. C. Bailey; Bourbon Spring, by Capt. R.A. Gibson; More Gold From Beatty; Bill Nye's Story of Big Steve; Let's Talk of Graves, of Worms, and Epitaths, by Walter S. Hughes; Current Americana
 Pouch Six
 Packet One, Don't Fret Packet (cover cartoon by Maggie Gerke) – The Alcalde's Report to the Cactus Nation; Conspiracy at Fort Oliver; The Last Chief of the Paiutes, Tecopah; My Twenty-Five Years With Peg Leg Smith; Culture Vultures at Old Adove Fort Oliver, by L. Burr Belden; Death Valley Scotty, Prospector and Showman, by Dane Coolidge; The Old Grouch, by John Herr; Lowdown on Western History
 Packet Two, The Contentment Packet (cover art by Art Loomer) – Post Pourri, by Pancho; The Desert (poem), by Don Blanding; Mule Decides to Quit Army; Death Valley Scotty, Prospector and Showman, by Dane Coolidge, second installment; The Great Cat Race, by Guy Bogart
 Packet Three, Mixed Up Packet (wraparound cover: The Old Depot, by C. D. Bass) – A Dog's Editorial; Life-Saving Snake Story; The Enchanted Station Wagon; Our Town, by John Weld; Death Valley Scotty, by Dane Coolidge (third installment)
 Packet Four, Shaggy Dog Edition (cover cartoon by Maggie Gerke) – "Saint Frijole" Rids Mexico of Arthritis; Death Valley Scotty, Prospector and Showman, by Dane Coolidge, fourth installment; A Chinee Boy Buys a Mine, by Capt. R.A. Gibson; Tough Miner in a Tough Country, by Ca
 Pouch Seven
 Packet One, Jack Ass Edition – Old Prunes, by Everett Blair; The Burro As I Know Him; Burro Flapjack Race; Burros, What They Are Made Of, by Mrs. James Rose Harvey; Burro Love Saga, by Paul Wilhelm; Shorty Harris Burro Story, by George Pipkin; Death Valley Scotty, Prospector and Showman, by Dane Coolidge, fifth installment; What About the Burro? by Chas. Lockwood; No Burros, No Gold
 Packet Two, Half Ass Edition (cover cartoon by Maggie Gerke) – Scotty's Castle; New Model Cockroaches; SHAME! Look What YOU Did! (Desert Beautification campaign); I AM A SECESSIONIST (Desert County campaign); Gold; Before the Jeep, They Tried to Replace the Burro; Death Valley Stories, by Capt. R.A. Gibson; I Killed a Burro, by Anonymous; Paul Wilhelm's Desert Column; Mulish Justice; Cremated Currency, by John Hilton
 Packet Three, Haunted Ghost Towns Packet (cover art by Maggie Gerke overprinted in blue) – Randsburg's Dancin' Skeletons; Harry Oliver Swept Here; Colorado's Day Time Ghost; The Day They All (one-act play), by Robert Finch
 Packet Four, The Pack Rat Edition (cover art by Maggie Gerke overprinted in orange) – Pioneer Yankee Traders; Toad Watson's Christmas; Shake Rattle & Rob, by Old Bill Williams; The Clown of the Rat Family, by Charles Lockwood; Paul Wilhelm's Desert Column; The Sad Tale of Arty Packrat; Pack Rats & Dope
 Pouch Eight
 Packet One, An Appetizer for Tourists, Bunk-House Edition (cover cartoon by Hank Ketcham) – All's Not Gold That Glitters; English Words in Southwest Spanish; Joost Playin'; Bewitched Sand, by J. Frank Dobie; Mischievous Burros; Pack Rat Arsonists, by Maidee Nelson; The Matador and the Burro; Souvenir of Mexico
 Packet Two, How to Be a Full-Time Idealist, Don Quixote Edition (cover art by Maggie Gerke overprinted in purple) – How to Be a Local Wit; Animal Crackers; The Handsome Horned Toad, by Florence Emmons; Injun Stuff; The Fish That Carried Its Own Pond With It, by Snow Creek Bert; 'Cher Ami' Honored With D.S.C., by Chas. Lockwood; Flowery Tribute to an Old Saloon, by James L. Wright; Was His Grand Pappy a'dreamin?, by Old Bill Williams; The Brook (poem), after Tennyson
 Packet Three, The Happy Scramble Edition (cover art by Maggie Gerke overprinted in amber) – Salton Sea Leaks; Colonel Phat's Fort Oliver Dispatches, by Phat Graettinger; Be One of My "Snoops"; Squeaky Springs; One Way of Proposing (poem); Gold Miners Make Strike in Sky, by Ray Henry; Outsmarted by a Burro, by Anne Evans Bancroft; Crow Made to Eat Crow; A Desert Fable
 Packet Four, The Voice of the Desert Packet (cover art by Art Loomer overprinted in brown) – Mutiny at the Fort, by Ray Corliss; Desert Editor's Best (poems), by George Bideaux; Old Sky-Eye Jones; The Big Wind, by Snow Creek Bert; Peg Leg Smith at Palmas Blancas, by Horace Parker
 Pouch Nine
 Packet One, Power of Positive Bologna Packet (cover cartoon by Harry Mace overprinted in red) – With a Brood in His Beard; Abe Lincoln's Dry Wit; The Wit of Utah, by Rolfe Peterson; Romantic Desert Trade Rats, by S.F. "Snoop" Garside; The Last Man to Fight Buffalo Bill; Two Damns and a Hell; The Biggest Little Paper; The Cat's Whiskers; Eager Beavers
 Packet Two, How Old Is Old? Second Childhood Packet (cover sketch by Roger Armstrong – Whip-Snapping; The Belled Burro; Wiffletree Carries the Mail; Famed Double-Barreled Whale of Great Salt Lake, by Rolfe Peterson; The Tumbleweed of Lordsburg, by Norman V. Christensen; Old Goldfield: A Town That Knew How – And How, by Frank Johnson; How Old Is Old?; "Oliver Rides Again" (words & sketch by Margo Gerke)
 Packet Three, Your Animals And You (cover overprinted in cinnamon) – Calico Ghost Town, A Bit of History, from Ted Hutchinson; The Jerky Trial, from Rolly Canfield; Best Dam Builder Moves into Glen Canyon; To Dearest Helen – My Devoted Friend, by William Randolph Hearst; Smuggled Chinese Girls & A Mother Mountain Lion; A Walter Knott Project, Calico Restored (AP); Oliver Twists
 Packet Four, Tepee (Etiquette) Packet (cover cartoon by Hank Ketcham) – Over Two Hundred Years of Vicious Propaganda: SHAME AMERICA; Mojave or Mohave? Death Valley; Tecopah, The Last Chief of the Paiutes; Only in California; Spring in His Britches, from Dr. Waldo Jones; Shoshone Indians First Aid Kit; Westward the Women, by Nancy Wilson Ross; 49er Gold Rush: Mystery Chief Showed the Good Side of the Indians, by Anonymous; Indian Signs
 Pouch Ten
 Packet One, Names and Places, Simple Lasting Desert Fun (cover woodblock overprinted in orange) – See the Old West in Festival & Pageant; Peg Leg Smith, The P.T. Barnum of Desert Ghosts; Peg-Leg Gets Applause: Under The Sun, by Bert Fireman; Studebaker Show, by Herb S. Hamlin; Dick Wick Hall Show; John B. Stetson Show; My Modesty Has Gone with the Wind
 Packet Two, A Handbook for Rangers & Guides (cover cartoon by Lamb) – Museum Nonsense; The Pack Rats Nest; Wampum; Infant Science (from TIME); Press Agent for a Ghost, by Alfred JaCoby
 Packet Three, Man and Animal in Tug-of-War (cover art by unknown, overprinted in orange) – Smart Animals and Stupid People; Mud in the Good Old Desert: My Dad Builds Historic Adobes, by Amy Oliver Vrooman; Galloping in From Another World; 17 Happy Years in the Life of a Desert Dog – As He Tells It (notes and obituaries re: Whiskers)
 Packet Four, Editor's 75th Anniversary Edition (cover cartoon by Bob Barnes) – Restoration of an Antique, by Ed Ainsworth; Old Fort Oliver, by Jack Smith; My Year With Pancho Villa – How to Stage a Fast-Moving Revolution; Pipe Dreams, by Herb Caen; Writers, Reporters & Editors; The Stubborn Queen (history of a prairie yacht); Simple Life in Desert Castles
 Pouch Eleven
 Packet One, Editor's 75th Anniversary Edition – Peg-Leg Smith's Gold, Where it was found and where it was lost; Gold; More About Dick Wick Hall; The Spanish Galleon of the Salton Sea; More About Pegleg Smith; The James Boys Loot; Where Is Pegleg Smith's Lost Mine; West Still Wild, by Harry Carr; Peg-Leg Gets Applause From Arizonas Expert Bert Fireman
 Packet Two, Desert Beautiful Edition, Raking Up The Past Edition (cover cartoon by Walt Disney) – SHAME! Look What YOU Did! (Desert Beautification campaign); I AM A SECESSIONIST (Desert County campaign); Press Agent For a Ghost; King of the Desert Rats, by Greenfield Lawrel; Let It Be Said We Died With Our Boots On (words & sketch by Margo Gerke)
 Packet Three, I Become a Symbol (cover art by Art Loomer) – The Peak of Saint Hyacinth, by Tom Hughes; The Purple Knight of the Salton Sink, by Gov. Goodwin Knight; Old Harry (letter to Walt Disney from Mrs. Clifford Henderson); Dick Wick Hall Show; John B. Stetson Show; My Modesty Has Gone with the Wind; Press Agent for a Ghost, by Bert Fireman
 Packet Four, Animal Intelligence (cover art by Maggie Gerke) – The Sad Tale of Arty Packrat; Nevada Bad Men Buried Alone; A True Desert Turtle Story; Shorty Harris, Jackass Prospector; Two Stories of Old Fort Oliver; The "Screaming Sands" of "Smuggler's Charybdis"; The True Story of Scotty, by George Palmer Putnam; Adobe, by John Hilton; Bourbon Springs, by Capt. R.A. Gibson
 Pouch Twelve
 Packet One, Teepee Tales – Council Fire; Death Valley; "Pioneers! O Pioneers!"; Indian Signs; Salton Sea Scrolls; Adult Western (poem) by W.C. Tuttle; Tumbleweeds; Injun Stuff; Prairie Feathers
 Packet Two, 21st Anniversary Packet – Death Valley: Tales From Old Ballarat; The Golden Fleece, by John D. Mitchell; Gold in Them Hills, by C.B. Glasscock; The Desert Rat (poem) by Clyde Terrell; Sagebrush Sermon, by Duncan Emrich; Shorty Jones' Magic Tablets, by Vollie Tripp; Smart, Those Burros, by C.B. Glasscock; Pay Dirt, by Scoop Garside; At Cheyenne (poem) by Eugene Field

See also
 Harry Oliver
 Desert Steve Ragsdale
 Jimmy Swinnerton (artist)
 Desert Magazine
 Tombstone Epitaph
 Calico Print (magazine)

References

External links
 Desert Rat Scrap Book archive
 Desert Rat Scrap Book group
 Harry Oliver Fandom Center site

Lifestyle magazines published in the United States
Quarterly magazines published in the United States
Colorado Desert
Defunct magazines published in the United States
History of the Mojave Desert region
Magazines established in 1945
Magazines disestablished in 1967
Magazines published in California
Mass media in Riverside County, California
Humor magazines